The Red Rocket is the humorous name  youtube user "TAOFLEDERMAUS" Jeff Heeszel  gave to a 3D printed %60 solid shotgun projectile, or slug.  It was printed using the Solidoodle 3 3-D printer. The slug was created by an American named  Tony Griffy. 

The printer used to create the bullet retails around $800 as of September 2014, and it took the printer about an hour to produce the slug. ABS thermoplastic material was used in the production of the slug. During testing, the slug penetrated a 2×12 piece of pine wood, and created a hole in a wire reel.

See also
List of notable 3D printed weapons and parts

References

Ammunition
3D printed firearms

Weapons and ammunition introduced in 2013